Lilian Anette Börjesson (born 11 November 1954) is a retired female badminton player and footballer from Sweden.

Badminton 
Börjesson is a five time women's singles champion at the Swedish National Badminton Championships and was a silver medalist at the 1980 European Badminton Championships, also in singles, as well as in mixed doubles.

European Championships 
Women's singles

Mixed doubles

Football
She captained Sweden to their win in the 1984 European Competition for Women's Football. In the final against England, Börjesson struck the first penalty in Sweden's shootout victory. She won a total of 70 caps between 1975 and 1987, scoring 12 goals. In 1985 she scored a hat-trick of penalty kicks against France.

Börjesson won the Årets Fotbollstjej Award, the forerunner of the Diamantbollen, in 1982.

After her retirement from playing, Börjesson founded a magazine dedicated to women's football, called nya mål.

Börjesson can be seen in the Sveriges Television documentary television series The Other Sport from 2013.

References

European results

Swedish female badminton players
1954 births
Living people
Sweden women's international footballers
Swedish women's footballers
Jitex BK players
Damallsvenskan players
Women's association football defenders
UEFA Women's Championship-winning players
20th-century Swedish women